Events from the year 1932 in Canada.

Incumbents

Crown 
 Monarch – George V

Federal government 
 Governor General – Vere Ponsonby, 9th Earl of Bessborough 
 Prime Minister – Richard Bedford Bennett
 Chief Justice – Francis Alexander Anglin (Ontario)
 Parliament – 17th

Provincial governments

Lieutenant governors 
Lieutenant Governor of Alberta – William Legh Walsh 
Lieutenant Governor of British Columbia – John William Fordham Johnson 
Lieutenant Governor of Manitoba – James Duncan McGregor  
Lieutenant Governor of New Brunswick – Hugh Havelock McLean 
Lieutenant Governor of Nova Scotia – Walter Harold Covert 
Lieutenant Governor of Ontario – William Mulock (until November 1) then Herbert Alexander Bruce 
Lieutenant Governor of Prince Edward Island – Charles Dalton 
Lieutenant Governor of Quebec – Henry George Carroll 
Lieutenant Governor of Saskatchewan – Hugh Edwin Munroe

Premiers 
Premier of Alberta – John Edward Brownlee   
Premier of British Columbia – Simon Fraser Tolmie
Premier of Manitoba – John Bracken 
Premier of New Brunswick – Charles Dow Richards 
Premier of Nova Scotia – Gordon Sidney Harrington
Premier of Ontario – George Stewart Henry 
Premier of Prince Edward Island – James D. Stewart
Premier of Quebec – Louis-Alexandre Taschereau 
Premier of Saskatchewan – James Thomas Milton Anderson

Territorial governments

Commissioners 
 Gold Commissioner then Controller of Yukon – George Ian MacLean (until June 30) then George A. Jeckell 
 Commissioner of Northwest Territories – Hugh Rowatt

Events
 February 17 – The "Mad Trapper" is killed by the Royal Canadian Mounted Police (RCMP) in the Yukon
 July 20 – The Ottawa Imperial Conference is held, it creates a zone of preferential trade within the Commonwealth
 August 1 – The Co-operative Commonwealth Federation (CCF) is formed in Calgary
 August 3 – Henri Bourassa leaves Le Devoir
 October 29 – The Dominion Drama Festival is founded

Full date unknown
 A seven-month miners strike occurs in Alberta's coal mines in Crowsnest Pass
 The first family planning clinic in Canada is set up by Elizabeth Bagshaw in Hamilton, Ontario. At the time, providing birth control was illegal.

Arts and literature

New Books
 A Broken Journey – Morley Callaghan

Sport
April 4 – The Northern Ontario Hockey Association's Sudbury Cub Wolves win their first Memorial Cup by defeating the Manitoba Junior Hockey League's Winnipeg Monarchs 2 games to 0. All games played at Shea's Amphitheatre in Winnipeg
April 9 – The Toronto Maple Leafs win their third Stanley Cup by defeating the New York Rangers 3 game to 0. The deciding game was played at the newly opened Maple Leaf Gardens
February 13 – Canada (represented by the Winnipeg Hockey Club) wins their fourth (consecutive) hockey gold medal at the 1932 Winter Olympics
December 3 – The Hamilton Tigers win their fifth and final Grey Cup by defeating the Regina Roughriders 25 to 6 in the 20th Grey Cup played at Hamilton's Civic Stadium

Births

January to March
 January 2 – Jean Little, author
 January 11 – Clotilda Douglas-Yakimchuk, nurse (d. 2021)
 February 4 – Bob Dawson, football player (d. 2017)
 February 24 – John Vernon, actor (d. 2005)
 February 28 – Don Francks, actor (d. 2016)
 March 1 – Donald Stovel Macdonald, politician and Minister
 March 2 – Jack Austin, politician and Senator
 March 14 – Norval Morrisseau, artist (d. 2007)

April to June
 April 3 – Jean-Claude Corbeil, linguist and lexicographer (d. 2022)
 April 6 – Eugène Bellemare, politician
 April 12 – Dick Fowler, mayor, MLA (d. 2012)
 April 14 – Bill Bennett, politician and 27th Premier of British Columbia (d. 2015)
 April 22 – Ron Basford, politician and Minister (d. 2005)
 April 26 – Michael Smith, biochemist, 1993 Nobel Prize in Chemistry laureate (d. 2000)
 May 7 – Jordi Bonet, artist (d. 1979)
 May 28 – John Savage, politician and 23rd Premier of Nova Scotia (d. 2003)
 June 5 – Gérard Charles Édouard Thériault, general and Chief of the Defence Staff (d. 1998)
 June 10 – Hal Jackman, businessman and 25th Lieutenant Governor of Ontario
 June 24 
 Mel Hurtig, publisher, author and political activist
 David McTaggart, environmentalist (d. 2001)

July to September
 July 11 – Jean-Guy Talbot, ice hockey defenceman and coach
 July 13 – Hubert Reeves, astrophysicist
 July 16 – Hédi Bouraoui, poet, novelist and academic
 July 22 – Doug Kyle, long-distance runner
 July 27 – George Ryga, playwright and novelist (d. 1987)
 August 2 – Leo Boivin, ice hockey player (d. 2021)
 August 11 – Izzy Asper, tax lawyer and media magnate (d. 2003)
 August 28 – Andy Bathgate, ice hockey player
 August 31 – Allan Fotheringham, newspaper and magazine journalist
 September 14 – Harry Sinden, ice hockey player, general manager and coach
 September 25 – Glenn Gould, pianist (d. 1982)
 September 27 – Gabriel Loubier, politician

October to December
 October 16 – Lucien Paiement, politician, Mayor of Laval (d. 2013)
 October 18 – Iona Campagnolo, politician, first female Lieutenant Governor of British Columbia
 October 24 – Robert Mundell, professor of economics (d. 2021)
 November 10 – Martin Hattersley, lawyer and politician
 November 13 – Marilyn Brooks, fashion designer
 November 29 – Ed Bickert, jazz guitarist
 December 6 – Hank Bassen, ice hockey player (d. 2009)

Deaths

 March 6 – Joseph-Hormisdas Legris, politician and Senator (b. 1850)
 July 22 – Reginald Fessenden, inventor and radio pioneer (b. 1866)
 August 1 – Wellington Willoughby, politician and lawyer (b. 1859)
 August 7 – Napoléon Belcourt, politician (b. 1860)
 August 21 – Leonard Burnett, politician, farmer and teacher (b. 1845)
 November 11 – Georgina Fraser Newhall, author and the bardess of the Clan Fraser Society of Canada (b. 1860)
 November 26 – J. E. H. MacDonald, artist of the Group of Seven (b. 1873)

Historical documents
Federal budget broadly raises tax rates and restricts exemptions

Liberals claim "blank cheque legislation" to aid unemployed allows government to bypass Parliament

Co-operative Commonwealth Federation founded "to regulate production, distribution and exchange for supplying human needs"

At average 35 cents per bushel, prices for wheat farmers about one-third what they were in 1929

United Farmers of Alberta convention's calls to nationalize credit and monetary system, and make wheat certificates legal tender

Mass meeting denounces maladministration by Newfoundland government of Richard Squires

German politics "a fight between philosophies of life[...]as violent and as irreconcilable as you will never be able to believe"

Place held by Jews of western Canada in professions, business and agriculture

House of Commons debates deportation procedures and rights of residents

Women's Institutes are for radio for Canadians and against "weariness of advertisement before and after every item of music or speech"

Edward Johnson on importance of music to mind and spirit

CBC interview with member of aircrew who joined "Mad Trapper" manhunt for Albert Johnson in Northwest Territories

Thunder Bay (Ont.) area farmers set local record for construction

Letter-to-editor profiles Watson Duchemin, inventor of brass roller bearing block

References

 
Years of the 20th century in Canada
Canada
1932 in North America